National Road No. 8 (10008) is one of the national highways of Cambodia.  The  road is located in Prey Veng Province of southeastern Cambodia. 

It begins at the junction with National Highway 6A. Immediately after it crosses the Mekong River on the Prek Tamak Bridge, it turns east to the village of Amphil near the border with Vietnam. It ends at the junction with National Highway 7.

References

Roads in Cambodia
Buildings and structures in Prey Veng province
Prey Veng province